The 1924 Bowling Green Normals football team was an American football team that represented Bowling Green State Normal School (later Bowling Green State University) as a member of the Northwest Ohio League (NOL) during the 1924 college football season. In its first season under head coach Warren Steller, the team compiled a 3–4 record and was outscored by a total of 73 to 60. Ralph Castner was the team captain.

On October 18, Bowling Green defeated , 13–6, without making a first down in the game. The team scored by recovering two fumbles and returning them a total of 65 yards for touchdowns. Ashland converted 13 first downs but had five passes intercepted. 

The school celebrated its 10th anniversary at the homecoming game on November 8. New bleachers seating over 1,000 persons were dedicated at the school's athletic field.

Schedule

References

Bowling Green
Bowling Green Falcons football seasons
Bowling Green Normals football